Ubud is a town on the Indonesian island of Bali in Ubud District, located amongst rice paddies and steep ravines in the central foothills of the Gianyar regency. Promoted as an arts and culture centre, it has developed a large tourism industry. It forms a northern part of the Greater Denpasar metropolitan area (known as Sarbagita).

Ubud, often mistaken for a small city, is an administrative district (kecamatan) with a population of 74,800 (as of the 2020 Census) in an area of 42.38 km2. The central area of Ubud desa (village) has a population of 11,971 and an area of 6.76 km2, and receives more than three million foreign tourists each year. The area surrounding the town is made up of small farms, rice paddies, agroforestry plantations, and tourist accommodations. As of 2018, more tourists visited Ubud than Denpasar to the south.

History 

Eighth-century legend tells of a Javanese priest, Rsi Markendya, who meditated at the confluence of two rivers (an auspicious site for Hindus) at the Ubud locality of Campuhan. Here he founded the Gunung Lebah Temple on the valley floor, the site of which remains a pilgrim destination.

The town was originally important as a source of medicinal herbs and plants; Ubud gets its name from the Balinese word ubad (medicine).

In the late 19th century, Ubud became the seat of feudal lords who owed their allegiance to the king of Gianyar, at one time the most powerful of Bali's southern states. The lords were members of the Balinese Kshatriya caste of Suk, and were significant supporters of the village's increasingly renowned arts scene.

Antonio Blanco, a Spanish-American artist, lived in Ubud from 1952 until his 
death in 1999. A new burst of creative energy came in the 1960s after the arrival of Dutch painter Arie Smit and the development of the Young Artists Movement. The Bali tourist boom since the late 1960s has seen much development in the town.

In 2002, terrorist bombings caused a decline in tourism throughout Bali including Ubud. In response to this a writer's festival was created, Ubud Writers and Readers Festival to help revive tourism, the island's main economic lifeline.

Streets 
The main street is Jalan Raya Ubud (Jalan Raya means main road), which runs east–west through the center of town. Two long roads, Jalan Monkey Forest and Jalan Hanoman, extend south from Jalan Raya Ubud.

Buildings 
Puri Saren Agung is a large palace located at the intersection of Monkey Forest and Raya Ubud roads. The residence of Tjokorda Gede Agung Sukawati (1910–1978), the last ruling monarch of Ubud, it is still owned by the royal family. Dance performances and ceremonies are held in its courtyard. The palace was also one of Ubud's first hotels, opening its doors back in the 1930s.

A number of Hindu temples exist, such as Pura Desa Ubud, which is the main temple, Pura Taman Saraswati, and Pura Dalem Agung Padangtegal, the temple of death. The Gunung Kawi temple is the site of the royal tombs. Goa Gajah, also known as the Elephant Cave, is located in a steep valley just outside Ubud near the town of Bedulu.

The Moon of Pejeng, in nearby Pejeng, is the largest single-cast bronze kettle drum in the world, dating from circa 300BC. It is a popular destination for tourists interested in local culture.

Transportation 
Like other towns popular with tourists in Bali, it is not permitted to order a metered taxi or ride-sharing service for pickup within Ubud. Instead, a taxi and price must be negotiated with a member of the local taxi cooperative. This protectionist system ensures the driver is from the local area, and also keeps the fares inflated to up to 10 times the rates available elsewhere.

Economy 
The economy of Ubud is highly reliant on tourism which focuses on shopping, resorts, museums, yoga, and zoos. There is a strong focus on sustainable economy in regard to the retail industry in Ubud, with many Bali-grown brands favoring materials and ingredients that would not cause much waste to the environment. From home and living amenities to tropical clothing brands, Ubud has quite a unique array of retail selections that have proven attractive to tourists from around the world.

One of the initiatives that have boosted Ubud as another popular tourist destination in recent years is Ubud Food Festival (UFF). Happening in less than a week in every April, this festival brings fellow restaurateurs and restaurants in Ubud together to create either special menus or particular promotions that may not be available in other months.

In contrast to the tourist area in southern Bali, the Ubud area is less densely populated by locals. However, tourists far outnumber locals, with the Gianyar regency seeing 3,842,663 tourist arrivals in 2017 - 1.3 million alone visiting Ubud Monkey Forest.

Culture 
The town and area has a number of art museums, such as the Blanco Renaissance Museum, the Puri Lukisan Museum, Neka Art Museum, and the Agung Rai Museum of Art. The Museum Rudana in Peliatan is nearby. Galleries promoting local and overseas crafts are abound, too, in Ubud. Some often hold exhibitions focused on stimulating a dialogue between both local and international artists, and less about selling artworks. One of the primary examples is BIASA ArtSpace, founded by art enthusiast and fashion designer Susanna Perini.

The Tek Tok is a traditional Balinese dance that is accompanied by musical sound of mouth 'Tek Tok' altogether with various combinations of body movement and other sounds. 
The story Draupadi Parwa told in the Tek Tok Dance tells a moral message, when a woman who embodies the values of patience, sacrifice, compassion, devotion, and holy sincerity is disrespected, then disasters and calamities will befall a kingdom or state. This story also conveys the message that truth, virtue, devotion and genuine compassion will always be protected by God. The Tek Tok dance performance is held regularly at the Bali Culture Center (BCC) in Ubud four times a week. Ubud Writers and Readers Festival (UWRF) is held every year, which is participated by writers and readers from all over the world.

Many Balinese dances are performed around Ubud including the Legong by the Peliatan Dance Group, the first troupe to travel abroad.

Climate
Ubud has a tropical rainforest climate (Af).

Administration
Ubud kecamatan/district is made of up the following desa (villages): Kedewatan, Sayan, Singakerta, Peliatan, Mas, Lodtunduh, Petulu, and Ubud itself.

Nature 
The Mandala Suci Wenara Wana is known to westerners as the Ubud Monkey Forest. The grounds contain an active temple and are located near the southern end of Monkey Forest Street. This protected area houses the Pura Dalem Agung Padangtegal, and as of June 2017, approximately 750 crab-eating macaque (Macaca fascicularis) monkeys live there.

The Campuhan ridge walk is a hill in nearby Campuhan, from where one can see two rivers, Tukad Yeh Wos Kiwa and Tukad Yeh Wos Tengen, merge. A one meter wide paved-block track runs about two kilometers to the top of the hill which is a popular spot to watch the sunset.

Notes

References 
 Picard, Kunang Helmi (1995) Artifacts and Early Foreign Influences. From

External links 

 Weather station in Ubud for live, accurate weather conditions

 
Populated places in Bali
Tourist attractions in Bali